Munjong of Joseon (15 November 1414 – 10 June 1452), personal name Yi Hyang (Korean: 이향; Hanja: 李珦), was the fifth ruler of the Joseon dynasty of Korea. As the eldest son of King Sejong the Great and Queen Soheon, he succeeded to the throne in 1450.

Biography 
Yi Hyang was the longest serving heir apparent during the Joseon dynasty, holding the position for a record 29 years.

In January 1421, Sejong instructed that his eight-year-old son be educated by scholars from the Hall of Worthies, then in October the same year, he was invested as crown prince and sent to study at the Sungkyunkwan. From 1442 until his own ascension to the throne in 1450, Yi Hyang served as regent and took care of state affairs during the final years of his father's reign, as Sejong developed various illnesses and disorders.

Most of his achievements were during his time as crown prince. Although credit is primarily given to Jang Yeong-sil for inventing the water gauge, the Annals of the Joseon dynasty affirm that it was the prince who found measures of water levels in the ground. Yi Hyang also contributed to the development of the Korean vernacular script (today known as Hangul).

Reign 
Yi Hyang ascended to the throne as King Munjong in 1450, and his reign marked the beginning of an imbalance of power at the Joseon court. Gim Bi-hwan describes the "interaction of the royal authority, administrative power, remonstrative power, and the collective authority of scholars outside the office," before Munjong as contributing to a situation that allowed the country to function constitutionally. During Munjong's reign, however, the balance collapsed, setting the stage for his brother to lead a coup d'etat in 1452.

Marriage 
Munjong was first married to Lady Gim of the (old) Andong Gim clan, between 1427 and 1429. She reportedly used witchcraft to gain his love. She also burned the shoes of Munjong's concubine, and made her drink the ashes with alcohol. When her father-in-law, King Sejong, found out about these actions, he deposed her.

The same year his first wife was ousted, Munjong remarried to Lady Bong of the Haeum Bong clan. She was deposed in 1436, when it was discovered that she had a homosexual love affair with one of her palace maids named So-ssang (소쌍).

Lastly, in 1437, Lady Gwon of the Andong Gwon clan became the third wife of Munjong, while he was still the crown prince. Originally a concubine, she gave birth to two daughters, one of whom was Princess Gyeonghye, and to Yi Hong-wi, Mujong's only surviving son, who later became King Danjong. Lady Gwon died in 1441, soon after the birth of her son, and when her husband took the throne, she was posthumously honored as "Queen Hyeondeok" (Hyeondeok Wanghu; 현덕왕후, 顯德王后).

Family 
Father: King Sejong of Joseon (15 May 1397 – 8 April 1450) (조선 세종)
Grandfather: King Taejong of Joseon (13 June 1367 – 30 May 1422) (조선 태종)
Grandmother: Queen Wongyeong of the Yeoheung Min clan (원경왕후 민씨) (29 July 1365 – 18 August 1420)
Mother: Queen Soheon of the Cheongsong Shim clan (소헌왕후 심씨) (12 October 1395 – 19 April 1446)
Grandfather: Shim On (심온) (1375 – 18 January 1419)
Grandmother: Lady Ahn of the Sunheung Ahn clan (순흥 안씨) (? – 1444)
Consorts and their respective issue(s):
 Crown Princess Hwi of the (old) Andong Gim clan (휘빈 김씨) (1410 – 1429) — No issue.
 Crown Princess Sun of the Haeum Bong clan (순빈 봉씨) (1414 – 1436) — No issue.
 Queen Hyeondeok of the Andong Gwon clan (현덕왕후 권씨) (17 April 1418 – 10 August 1441)
 First daughter (1432 – 1433)
 Princess Gyeonghye (경혜공주) (1436 – 30 December 1473), second daughter
 Crown Prince Yi Hong-wi (왕세자 이홍위) (9 August 1441 – 7 November 1457), first son
 Royal Noble Consort Suk of the Namyang Hong clan (숙빈 홍씨) (1418 – ?)
 Fourth daughter (1441 – 1444)
 Royal Consort Sug-ui of the Nampyeong Mun clan (숙의 문씨) (1426 – 1508)
 Royal Consort So-yong of the Munhwa Yu clan (소용 유씨)
 Royal Consort So-yong of the Andong Gwon clan (소용 권씨)
 Royal Consort So-yong of the Dongnae Jeong clan (소용 정씨)
 Second son
 Royal Consort So-yong of the Papyeong Yun clan (소용 윤씨)
 Court Lady Yang (사칙 양씨)
Princess Gyeongsuk (경숙옹주) (1439 – 1482), third daughter
 Fifth daughter (1450 – 1451)
 Court Lady Jang (상궁 장씨)
 Third son

Ancestry

In popular culture 
 Portrayed by Hwang Chi-hoon in the 1983 MBC TV series The King of Chudong Palace.
 Portrayed by Jeon Moo-song in the 1998 KBS TV series King and Queen.
Portrayed by Oh Eun-chan and Lee Sang-yeob in the 2008 KBS TV series The Great King, Sejong.
Portrayed by Park Jung-chul in the 2008 film The Divine Weapon.
Portrayed by Jung Dong-hwan in the 2011 KBS2 TV series The Princess' Man.
 Portrayed by Sunwoo Jae-duk in the 2011 JTBC TV series Insu, the Queen Mother.
 Portrayed by Kim Tae-woo in 2013 film The Face Reader.
 Portrayed by Han Jeong-woo and Choi Seung-hoon in the 2016 KBS1 TV series Jang Yeong-sil.

Notes

References

External links 
 http://navercast.naver.com/contents.nhn?rid=77&contents_id=57444

1414 births
1452 deaths
15th-century Korean monarchs
People from Seoul